Levice is a comune (municipality) in the Province of Cuneo in the Italian region Piedmont, located about  southeast of Turin and about  northeast of Cuneo.

Levice borders the following municipalities: Bergolo, Castelletto Uzzone, Feisoglio, Gorzegno, Pezzolo Valle Uzzone, Prunetto, and Torre Bormida.

Demographic evolution

References

Cities and towns in Piedmont

lmo:Leis